Master Lu may refer to:

 Zilu (lit. "Master Lu"), one of the Twelve Philosophers of traditional Confucianism
 Lu Sheng-yen (born 1945), commonly referred to by followers as Grand Master Lu (師尊), the founder of the True Buddha School
The Riddle of Master Lu, a 1996 adventure game
 Jun Hong Lu (1959–2021), Master Jun Hong Lu or Master Lu (卢台长), Chinese-born Australian Buddhist faith healer